Madanwala Grama Niladhari Division is a Grama Niladhari Division of the Hanguranketha Divisional Secretariat of Nuwara Eliya District of Central Province, Sri Lanka. It has Grama Niladhari Division Code 493.

Hanguranketa Town and Hanguranketa are located within, nearby or associated with Madanwala.

Madanwala is a surrounded by the Damunumeya, Diya - Udagama, Dolugala, Kottala and Walalawela Grama Niladhari Divisions.

Demographics

Ethnicity 

The Madanwala Grama Niladhari Division has a Sinhalese majority (98.7%). In comparison, the Hanguranketha Divisional Secretariat (which contains the Madanwala Grama Niladhari Division) has a Sinhalese majority (86.4%)

Religion 

The Madanwala Grama Niladhari Division has a Buddhist majority (97.7%). In comparison, the Hanguranketha Divisional Secretariat (which contains the Madanwala Grama Niladhari Division) has a Buddhist majority (86.2%) and a significant Hindu population (12.6%)

References 

Grama Niladhari Divisions of Hanguranketha Divisional Secretariat